A fake kidnapping is a kidnapping that has been staged by the victim.

Notable incidents
Brazilian soccer player Somália - on January 7, 2011, Somália claimed he had been kidnapped at gunpoint before being robbed. CCTV footage later proved that he was simply late for training, and fabricated the story in order to circumvent the club's 40% wage drop in case of tardiness. Somália was charged with filing a false police report and on January 19, 2011, agreed to a deal offered by prosecutors to donate R$22,000 (approximately U.S.$13,000) to the victims of the then-recent floods in Rio de Janeiro, in order to avoid a possible prison sentence and criminal record.
Dar Heatherington (born 1963) - a politician who claimed to have been abducted in Montana in 2003.
Joanna Grenside - an aerobics teacher from Harpenden, England; staged her disappearance a few days before Christmas 1992. She suffered from the eating disorder bulimia and sought to avoid the overindulgence of food that went on at Christmas parties.
Fairlie Arrow - a singer; claimed abduction in Queensland in 1991. Joanna Grenside was working in Queensland at the time, leading to the possibility that it inspired her own event later.
Karol Sanchez - a 16-year-old girl; had two young adult men that were friends of hers stage her abduction on December 16, 2019 around midnight in the Bronx, when she and her mother were walking down a street. There, the two men "kidnapped" Sanchez in front of her horrified mother, who was under the impression that her daughter's "abduction" was real. Karol's mother attempted to fight the two men in attempt to rescue her, but was shoved aside by the men before driving off with Karol in their posse. Karol was found safe and unharmed the next day where she confessed that she was never in actual danger due to her abduction being staged. Sanchez's motivations stemmed from her mother's intentions to move their family to Honduras, as the teenager had no wish to leave her old life behind.

References

Kidnapping